The Stonewall Inn, often shortened to Stonewall, is a gay bar and recreational tavern in the Greenwich Village neighborhood of Lower Manhattan, New York City, and the site of the Stonewall riots of 1969, which is widely considered to be the single most important event leading to the gay liberation movement and the modern fight for LGBT rights in the United States.

The original Inn, which operated between 1967 and 1969, was located at 51–53 Christopher Street, between Seventh Avenue South and Waverly Place. The Stonewall Inn in New York went out of business shortly after the uprising and was leased as two separate spaces to a number of different businesses over the years. A bar named Stonewall operated out of 51 Christopher Street in 1987–1989; when it closed, the historic vertical sign was removed from the building's facade. None of the original Stonewall Inn's interior finishes remain. In 1990, 53 Christopher Street was leased to a new bar named New Jimmy's at Stonewall Place and about a year later the bar's owner changed the name to Stonewall. The current management bought the bar in 2006 and have operated it as the Stonewall Inn ever since. The buildings at 51 and 53 Christopher Street are privately owned. 

The buildings are both part of the New York City Landmarks Preservation Commission's Greenwich Village Historic District, designated in April 1969. The buildings and surrounding area have been listed on the National Register of Historic Places since 1999 and named a National Historic Landmark in 2000. They were the first LGBTQ-associated properties listed on the State and National Registers of Historic Places and were the first LGBTQ National Historic Landmarks. On June 23, 2015, the Stonewall Inn became the first landmark in New York City to be recognized by the New York City Landmarks Preservation Commission on the basis of its status in LGBT history, and on June 24, 2016, the Stonewall National Monument was named the first U.S. National Monument dedicated to the LGBTQ-rights movement. Stonewall 50 – WorldPride NYC 2019 was the largest international Pride celebration in history, produced by Heritage of Pride and enhanced through a partnership with the I ❤ NY program's LGBT division, commemorating the 50th anniversary of the Stonewall uprising, with 150,000 participants and five million spectators attending in Manhattan alone.

Early history
In 1930, the Stonewall Inn, sometimes known as Bonnie's Stonewall Inn, presumably in honor of its proprietor, Vincent Bonavia, opened at 91 Seventh Avenue South. Purportedly a tearoom, a restaurant serving light meals and non-alcoholic beverages, it was in fact a speakeasy, which was raided by prohibition agents in December 1930, along with several other Village nightspots.

In 1934, a year after the end of Prohibition, Bonavia relocated to 51–53 Christopher Street, where a large vertical sign was installed with the name "Bonnie's Stonewall Inn." The two storefronts at 51–53 Christopher Street were constructed as stables in the mid-19th century. In 1930, the buildings were combined with one facade to house a bakery. Bonnie's Stonewall Inn operated as a bar and restaurant until 1964, when the interior was destroyed by fire.

In 1966, three members of the Mafia invested in the Stonewall Inn, turning it into a gay bar. It had previously been a restaurant and a nightclub for heterosexuals. The Mafia believed that a business catering to the otherwise shunned gay community might well turn a profit, as they served watered-down alcohol and demanded regular payoffs for "protection". It was also common for the Mafia to blackmail closeted wealthy patrons. The Stonewall became a popular gay bar as it had a dance floor and jukebox. While police raids were common, it was one of the only bars in the city where couples could slow dance together (even if the raids meant they would have to quickly split up). The bar was operated as a private club, with patrons signing a logbook upon entry, to avoid the requirement of a liquor license, and the owner gave cash bribes to local police as a payoff. Though the bar was not openly used for prostitution, drug sales and other "cash transactions" took place. Many bars kept extra liquor in a secret panel behind the bar, or in a car down the block, to facilitate resuming business as quickly as possible if the alcohol was seized in a raid.

Uprising

The Stonewall uprising was a series of spontaneous, violent protests by members of the gay community against a police raid that took place in the early morning hours of June 28, 1969, at the Stonewall Inn in the Greenwich Village neighborhood of New York City. Around 1:20 a.m., Seymour Pine of the New York City Vice Squad Public Morals Division and four other officers joined forces with two male and two female undercover police officers who were already stationed inside the bar. The lights on the dance floor flashed, as was the usual signal to alert patrons of the arrival of police. However, this time the routine raid did not go as planned. Because the patrol wagons responsible for transporting the arrested patrons and the alcohol from the bar took longer than expected, a crowd of released patrons and by-standers began to grow outside of the Inn. The crowd swelled as the night went on. Writer David Carter notes that the police officers eventually became so afraid of the crowd that they refused to leave the bar for 45 minutes.

The last straw came when a scuffle broke out when a Butch lesbian in handcuffs was escorted from the door of the bar to the waiting police wagon several times. She escaped repeatedly and fought with four of the police, swearing and shouting, for about 10 minutes. Bystanders recalled that the woman, identified as Stormé DeLarverie, sparked the crowd to fight when she looked at bystanders and shouted, "Why don't you guys do something?!" After an officer picked her up and heaved her into the back of the wagon, the crowd became a mob and went "berserk": "It was at that moment that the scene became explosively violent."

The police tried to restrain some of the crowd, and knocked a few people down, which incited bystanders even more. The riots went on to escalate to the point where the bar was on fire and the Tactical Police Force (TPF) of the New York City Police Department arrived to free the police officers who had barricaded themselves inside the bar. The TPF formed a phalanx and attempted to clear the streets. It took them until 4:00 in the morning to do so.

The events that took place that week at the Stonewall Inn led to the formation of some of the first radical gay activist groups in the U.S., such as the Gay Liberation Front and Street Transvestite Action Revolutionaries (STAR). A year later, the first Christopher Street Liberation Day was held—a commemorative event consisting of a march from Greenwich Village to the Sheep Meadow in New York's Central Park. This became the inspiration and template for gay pride parades in the United States and in many other countries.

After the riots

In late 1969, a few months after the uprising, the Stonewall Inn closed. In 1972, it reopened at 211 22nd Street in Miami Beach, Florida. In May 1973, two patrons of that venue filed a lawsuit against the local police chief, asserting malicious harassment. The Miami Beach location (reported as "Stonewall Discotheque") burned down shortly before 7:00 a.m. on March 2, 1974. Arson was suspected.

Over the next 20 years, the original space in Manhattan was occupied by various other establishments, including a bagel sandwich shop, a Chinese restaurant, and a shoe store. Many visitors and new residents in the neighborhood were unaware of the building's history or its connection to the Stonewall riots. In the early 1990s, a new gay bar, named simply "Stonewall", opened in the west half of the original Stonewall Inn. Around this time, the block of Christopher Street between Sixth and Seventh Avenues was co-named "Stonewall Place."

In June 1999, through the efforts of the Greenwich Village Society for Historic Preservation and the Organization of Lesbian and Gay Architects and Designers, the area including Stonewall was listed on the National Register of Historic Places for its historic significance to gay and lesbian history. The area delineated included the Stonewall Inn, Christopher Park, and portions of surrounding streets and sidewalks. The area was declared a National Historic Landmark in February 2000.

The building was renovated in the late 1990s and became a popular multi-floor nightclub, with theme nights and contests. The club gained popularity for several years, gaining a young urban gay clientele until it closed again in 2006, due to neglect, gross mismanagement, and noise complaints from the neighbors at 45 Christopher Street.

In January 2007, it was announced that the Stonewall Inn was undergoing major renovation under the supervision of local businessmen Bill Morgan and Kurt Kelly, as well as the only female lesbian investor, Stacy Lentz, who ultimately reopened the Stonewall Inn in March 2007. Subsequently, regaining popularity and continuing to pay homage to its historic significance, the Stonewall Inn hosts a variety of local music artists, drag shows, trivia nights, cabaret, karaoke and private parties. Since the landmark passage of New York State's Marriage Equality Act the inn now offers gay wedding receptions as well. Kelly, Morgan, and Lentz have also been dedicated to incorporating various fundraising events for a host of LGBT non-profit organizations.

In June 2014, the Stonewall 45 exhibit, sponsored by the Arcus Foundation and the Greenwich Village Society for Historic Preservation, memorialized the 45th anniversary of the Stonewall uprising with posters in the windows of Christopher Street businesses, including the Stonewall Inn. On June 23, 2015, the New York City Landmarks Preservation Commission designated Stonewall as a city landmark, the first city location to be considered based on its LGBT cultural significance alone. The Greenwich Village Society for Historic Preservation kept up advocacy efforts for this over the tenures of two New York City Landmarks Preservation Commission chairs. In June 2016, U.S. President Barack Obama established a 7.7-acre (3.11 ha) area around the site as the Stonewall National Monument, the first LGBT U.S. National Park site. Christopher Park is owned by the NPS. The two buildings at 51 and 53 Christopher Street remain in private hands. On June 24, 2016, Governor Cuomo designated The Stonewall Inn a State Historic Site. Stonewall thus became the first LGBT-history site in the country listed on the State and National Registers of Historic Places, and the first LGBT-history site in New York City.

In popular culture

 Brazilian singer Renato Russo recorded his first solo album, The Stonewall Celebration Concert, in 1994, celebrating the 25th anniversary of the riots. The booklet accompanying the album contained information about 29 social organizations, several of which related to gay rights; part of the royalties was donated to such organizations.
 The 1995 movie Stonewall, directed by Nigel Finch, is loosely based on the incidents leading up to the Stonewall riots.
 The 2012 play Hit the Wall, by Ike Holter, is a dramatic retelling of the Stonewall riots.
 The 2015 movie Stonewall, directed by Roland Emmerich, is a coming-of-age drama focused on a fictional, young gay male protagonist. It takes place during the time shortly before and during the 1969 riots. It stars Jeremy Irvine, Jonny Beauchamp, Jonathan Rhys Meyers, Ron Perlman, and Caleb Landry Jones.
 The 2018 short film Happy Birthday, Marsha! is a fictional account of the lives of Marsha P. Johnson and Sylvia Rivera in the hours leading up to the Stonewall uprising, featuring Mya Taylor as Johnson.
 Madonna gave a surprise performance at Stonewall Inn on December 31, 2018; she had been named an "ambassador" for the 50th anniversary celebrations in 2019.

See also

Stonewall National Monument
LGBTQ culture in New York City
List of New York City Landmarks
List of National Historic Landmarks in New York City
List of National Monuments of the United States
National Register of Historic Places listings in Manhattan below 14th Street

References

External links

The Stonewall Riots – About.com 
 "Stonewall NYC" on https://vimeo.com/coolloungeradio
Original Stonewall Inn to close  – Pinknews.co.uk

1846 establishments in New York (state)
1967 establishments in New York City
Articles containing video clips
Commercial buildings completed in 1846
Cultural history of New York City
Drinking establishments in Greenwich Village
Drinking establishments on the National Register of Historic Places in Manhattan
LGBT drinking establishments in New York City
National Historic Landmarks in Manhattan
New York City Designated Landmarks in Manhattan
Stonewall National Monument